Nowy Dwór Prudnicki  (German Neuhof) is a village in the administrative district of Gmina Krapkowice, within Krapkowice County, Opole Voivodeship, in south-western Poland. 

References

Villages in Krapkowice County